The Governor of Buenos Aires Province is a citizen of the Buenos Aires Province of Argentina, holding the office of governor for the corresponding period. The governor is elected alongside a vice-governor. Currently the governor of Buenos Aires Province is Axel Kicillof since December 11, 2019.

Requirements
To be able to be elected governor, the person must be an Argentine citizen and must have been born in Argentina, or be the child of an Argentine citizen if born in a foreign country. The citizen must also be at least 30 years old, and have at least 5 uninterrupted years of residence in the province if not natural from it. The term lasts 4 years, with the chance of a single reelection.

List of officeholders

Governor-intendant

United Provinces of the Río de la Plata and the Argentine Confederation
Governors managing international relations of the United Provinces of the Río de la Plata and the Argentine Confederation (de facto Heads of State).

Argentine Confederation
Governors without national power during the Argentine Confederation.

State of Buenos Aires (independent from Argentina)

List of provincial governors before the enactment of the Sáenz Peña Law (1862–1914)

List of governors since the enactment of the Sáenz Peña Law (1914–present)

See also
 Legislature of Buenos Aires Province
 Buenos Aires Province Senate
 Buenos Aires Province Chamber of Deputies

References

Governors of Buenos Aires Province
Buenos Aires